Scottish inventions and discoveries are objects, processes or techniques either partially or entirely invented, innovated, or discovered by a person born in or descended from Scotland. In some cases, an invention's Scottishness is determined by the fact that it came into existence in Scotland (e.g., animal cloning), by non-Scots working in the country. Often, things that are discovered for the first time are also called "inventions" and in many cases there is no clear line between the two.

Some Scottish contributions have indirectly and directly led to controversial political ideas and policies, such as the measures taken to enforce British hegemony in the time of the British Empire. There are many books devoted solely to the subject, as well as scores of websites listing Scottish inventions and discoveries with varying degrees of science.

Even before the Industrial Revolution, Scots have been at the forefront of innovation and discovery across a wide range of spheres. Some of the most significant products of Scottish ingenuity include James Watt's steam engine, improving on that of Thomas Newcomen, the bicycle, macadamisation (not to be confused with tarmac or tarmacadam), Alexander Graham Bell's invention of the first practical telephone, John Logie Baird's invention of television, Alexander Fleming's discovery of penicillin and insulin.

The following is a list of inventions, innovations, or discoveries that are known or generally recognised as being Scottish.

Road transport innovations
 Macadamised roads (the basis for, but not specifically, tarmac): John Loudon McAdam (1756–1836)
 The pedal bicycle: Attributed to both Kirkpatrick Macmillan (1813–1878) and Thomas McCall (1834–1904)
 The pneumatic tyre: Robert William Thomson and John Boyd Dunlop (1822–1873)
 The overhead valve engine: David Dunbar Buick (1854–1929)

Civil engineering innovations

 Tubular steel: Sir William Fairbairn (1789–1874)
 The Falkirk wheel: Initial designs by Nicoll Russell Studios, Architects, RMJM and engineers Binnie, Black, and Veatch (Opened 2002)
 The patent slip for docking vessels: Thomas Morton (1781–1832)
 The Drummond Light: Thomas Drummond (1797–1840)
 Canal design: Thomas Telford (1757–1834)
 Dock design improvements: John Rennie (1761–1821)
 Crane design improvements: James Bremner (1784–1856)
 "Trac Rail Transposer", a machine to lay rail track patented in 2005, used by Network Rail in the United Kingdom and the New York City Subway in the United States.

Aviation innovations
 Aircraft design: Frank Barnwell (1910) Establishing the fundamentals of aircraft design at the University of Glasgow.

Power innovations
 Condensing steam engine improvements: James Watt (1736–1819)
 Thermodynamic cycle: William John Macquorn Rankine (1820–1872)
 Coal-gas lighting: William Murdoch (1754–1839)
 The Stirling heat engine: Rev. Robert Stirling (1790–1878)
 Carbon brushes for dynamos: George Forbes (1849–1936)
 The Clerk cycle gas engine: Sir Dugald Clerk (1854–1932)
 The wave-powered electricity generator: by South African Engineer Stephen Salter in 1977
 The Pelamis Wave Energy Converter ("red sea snake" wave energy device): Richard Yemm, 1998

Shipbuilding innovations
 Europe's first passenger steamboat: Henry Bell (1767–1830)
 The first iron–hulled steamship: Sir William Fairbairn (1789–1874)
 The first practical screw propeller: Robert Wilson (1803–1882)
 Marine engine innovations: James Howden (1832–1913)
John Elder and Charles Randolph (Marine Compound expansion engine)

Military innovations
Lieutenant-General Sir David Henderson two areas:
Field intelligence. Argued for the establishment of the Intelligence Corps.  Wrote Field Intelligence: Its Principles and Practice (1904) and The Art of Reconnaissance (1907) on the tactical intelligence of modern warfare.
Intelligence: Allan Pinkerton developed the still relevant intelligence techniques of "shadowing" (surveillance) and "assuming a role" (undercover work) in his time as head of the Union Intelligence Service.

Heavy industry innovations
 Coal mining extraction in the sea on an artificial island by Sir George Bruce of Carnock (1575). Regarded as one of the industrial wonders of the late medieval period.
 Making cast steel from wrought iron: David Mushet (1772–1847)
 Wrought iron sash bars for glass houses: John C. Loudon (1783–1865)
 The hot blast oven: James Beaumont Neilson (1792–1865)
 The steam hammer: James Nasmyth (1808–1890)
 Wire rope: Robert Stirling Newall (1812–1889)
 Steam engine improvements: William Mcnaught (1831–1881)
 The Fairlie, a narrow gauge, double-bogie railway engine: Robert Francis Fairlie (1831–1885)
 Cordite - Sir James Dewar, Sir Frederick Abel (1889)

Agricultural innovations
 Threshing machine improvements: James Meikle (c.1690-c.1780) & Andrew Meikle (1719–1811)
 Hollow pipe drainage: Sir Hew Dalrymple, Lord Drummore (1700–1753)
 The Scotch plough: James Anderson of Hermiston (1739–1808)
 Deanstonisation soil-drainage system: James Smith (1789–1850)
 The mechanical reaping machine: Rev. Patrick Bell (1799–1869)
 The Fresno scraper: James Porteous (1848–1922)
 The Tuley tree shelter: Graham Tuley in 1979

Communication innovations
 Telephone: Alexander Graham Bell (1847-1922)
 Print stereotyping: William Ged (1690–1749)
 Roller printing: Thomas Bell (patented 1783)
 The adhesive postage stamp and the postmark: claimed by James Chalmers (1782–1853)
 The Waverley pen nib innovations thereof: Duncan Cameron (1825–1901) The popular "Waverley" was unique in design with a narrow waist and an upturned tip designed to make the ink flow more smoothly on the paper.
 Universal Standard Time: Sir Sandford Fleming (1827–1915)
 Light signalling between ships: Admiral Philip H. Colomb (1831–1899)
 The underlying principles of radio: James Clerk Maxwell (1831–1879)
 The Kinetoscope, a motion picture camera: devised in 1889 by William Kennedy Dickson (1860-1935)
 The teleprinter: Frederick G. Creed (1871–1957)
The British Broadcasting Corporation (BBC): John Reith, 1st Baron Reith (1922) its founder, first general manager and director-general of the British Broadcasting Corporation
 RADAR: A significant contribution made by Robert Watson-Watt (1892–1973) alongside Englishman Henry Tizard (1885-1959) and others
 The automated teller machine and Personal Identification Number system: James Goodfellow (born 1937)

Publishing firsts 
 The first edition of the Encyclopedia Britannica (1768–81)
 The first English textbook on surgery (1597)
 The first modern pharmacopaedia, William Cullen (1776). The book became 'Europe's principal text on the classification and treatment of disease'. His ideas survive in the terms nervous energy and neuroses (a word that Cullen coined).
 The first postcards and picture postcards in the UK
 The educational foundation of Ophthalmology: Stewart Duke-Elder in his ground breaking work including ‘Textbook of Ophthalmology and fifteen volumes of System of Ophthalmology’

Culture and the arts 
 Gospel music: according to Yale University music professor Willie Ruff, the singing of psalms in Scottish Gaelic by Presbyterians of the Scottish Hebrides evolved from "lining out"—where one person sang a solo and others followed—into the call and response of gospel music of the American South.
 Scottish National Portrait Gallery, designed by Sir Robert Rowand Anderson (1889): the world's first purpose-built portrait gallery.
 Ethereal wave: a subgenre of dark wave music that emerged with the release of the albums Head over Heels and Treasure by Scottish band Cocteau Twins.
 Shoegaze: a subgenre of indie and alternative rock pioneered by Scottish bands such as Cocteau Twins and The Jesus and Mary Chain.
 Future bass: a style of electronic dance music pioneered by Scottish producers such as Rustie and Hudson Mohawke.
 Hyperpop: a microgenre characterized by a maximalist or exaggerated take on popular music pioneered by Scottish producer Sophie.
 Christianisation of Scotland and England partially done by Scots who invented new kinds of pacifist missionary traditions
 Dean George Berkeley and His Entourage, a portrait painted by Scottish-born John Smibert that became one of the most influential New England paintings

Scientific innovations
 Logarithms: John Napier (1550–1617)
 Modern Economics founded by Adam Smith (1776) 'The father of modern economics' with the publication of The Wealth of Nations.
Modern Sociology: Adam Ferguson (1767) ‘The Father of Modern Sociology’ with his work An Essay on the History of Civil Society
 Hypnotism: James Braid (1795–1860) the Father of Hypnotherapy
 Tropical medicine: Sir Patrick Manson known as the father of Tropical Medicine
Modern Geology: James Hutton ‘The Founder of Modern Geology’
 The theory of Uniformitarianism: James Hutton (1788): a fundamental principle of Geology the features of the geologic time takes millions of years.
 The theory of electromagnetism: James Clerk Maxwell (1831–1879)
 The discovery of the Composition of Saturn's Rings James Clerk Maxwell (1859): determined the rings of Saturn were composed of numerous small particles, all independently orbiting the planet. At the time it was generally thought the rings were solid. The Maxwell Ringlet and Maxwell Gap were named in his honor.
 The Maxwell–Boltzmann distribution by James Clerk Maxwell (1860): the basis of the kinetic theory of gases, that speeds of molecules in a gas will change at different temperatures. The original theory first hypothesised by Maxwell and confirmed later in conjunction with Ludwig Boltzmann.
 Popularising the decimal point: John Napier (1550–1617)
 The first theory of the Higgs boson by English born  Peter Higgs particle-physics theorist at the University of Edinburgh (1964)
 The Gregorian telescope: James Gregory (1638–1675)
 The discovery of Proxima Centauri, the closest known star to the Sun, by Robert Innes (1861–1933)
 One of the earliest measurements of distance to the Alpha Centauri star system, the closest such system outside of the Solar System, by Thomas Henderson (1798–1844)
 The discovery of Centaurus A, a well-known starburst galaxy in the constellation of Centaurus, by James Dunlop (1793–1848)
 The discovery of the Horsehead Nebula in the constellation of Orion, by Williamina Fleming (1857–1911)
 The world's first oil refinery and a process of extracting paraffin from coal laying the foundations for the modern oil industry: James Young (1811–1883)
 The identification of the minerals yttrialite, thorogummite, aguilarite and nivenite: by William Niven (1889)
 The concept of latent heat by French-born Joseph Black (1728–1799)
 Discovering the properties of Carbon dioxide by French-born Joseph Black (1728–1799)
 The concept of Heat capacity by French-born Joseph Black (1728–1799)
 The pyroscope, atmometer and aethrioscope scientific instruments: Sir John Leslie (1766–1832)
 Identifying the nucleus in living cells: Robert Brown (1773–1858)
 An early form of the Incandescent light bulb: James Bowman Lindsay (1799-1862)
 Colloid chemistry: Thomas Graham (1805–1869)
 The kelvin SI unit of temperature by Irishman William Thomson, Lord Kelvin (1824–1907)
 Devising the diagramatic system of representing chemical bonds: Alexander Crum Brown (1838–1922)
 Criminal fingerprinting: Henry Faulds (1843–1930)
 The noble gases: Sir William Ramsay (1852–1916)
 The cloud chamber recording of atoms: Charles Thomson Rees Wilson (1869–1959)
 The discovery of the Wave of Translation, leading to the modern general theory of solitons by John Scott Russell (1808-1882)
 Statistical graphics: William Playfair founder of the first statistical line charts, bar charts, and pie charts in (1786) and (1801) known as a scientific ‘milestone’ in statistical graphs and data visualization
 The Arithmetic mean density of the Earth: Nevil Maskelyne conducted the Schiehallion experiment conducted at the Scottish mountain of Schiehallion, Perthshire 1774
The first isolation of methylated sugars, trimethyl and tetramethyl glucose: James Irvine
 Discovery of the Japp–Klingemann reaction: to synthesize hydrazones from β-keto-acids (or β-keto-esters) and aryl diazonium salts 1887
 Pioneering work on nutrition and poverty: John Boyd Orr (1880–1971)
 Ferrocene synthetic substances: Peter Ludwig Pauson in 1955
 The first cloned mammal (Dolly the Sheep): Was conducted in The Roslin Institute research centre in 1996 by English scientists Ian Wilmut (born 1944) and Keith Campbell (1954–2012).
 The seismometer innovations thereof: James David Forbes
 Metaflex fabric innovations thereof: University of St. Andrews (2010) application of the first manufacturing fabrics that manipulate light in bending it around a subject. Before this such light manipulating atoms were fixed on flat hard surfaces. The team at St Andrews are the first to develop the concept to fabric.
 Tractor beam innovations thereof: St. Andrews University (2013) the world's first to succeed in creating a functioning Tractor beam that pulls objects on a microscopic level
 Macaulayite: Dr. Jeff Wilson of the Macaulay Institute, Aberdeen.
 Discovery of Catacol whitebeam by Scottish Natural Heritage and the Royal Botanic Garden Edinburgh (1990s): a rare tree endemic and unique to the Isle of Arran in south west Scotland. The trees were confirmed as a distinct species by DNA testing.
The first positive displacement liquid flowmeter, the reciprocating piston meter by Thomas Kennedy Snr.

Sports innovations

Scots have been instrumental in the invention and early development of several sports:
 Australian rules football  Scots were prominent with many innovations in the early evolution of the game, including the establishment of the Essendon Football Club by the McCracken family from Ayrshire
 Several modern athletics events, i.e. shot put and the hammer throw, derive from Highland Games and earlier 12th century Scotland
 Curling
 Gaelic handball The modern game of handball is first recorded in Scotland in 1427, when King James I, an ardent handball player, had his men block up a cellar window in his palace courtyard that was interfering with his game.
 Cycling, invention of the pedal-cycle
 Golf  (see Golf in Scotland)
 1848: Association football's Glasgow rules (largely the sport's rules as we know them today) established at University of Glasgow.
 Ice Hockey, invented by the Scots regiments in Atlantic Canada by playing Shinty on frozen lakes.
 Shinty The history of Shinty as a non-standardised sport pre-dates Scotland the Nation. The rules were standardised in the 19th century by Archibald Chisholm
 Rugby sevens: Ned Haig and David Sanderson (1883)
 The Dugout was invented by Aberdeen FC Coach Donald Colman in the 1920s
 The world's first Robot Olympics which took place in Glasgow in 1990.

Medical innovations
 Pioneering the use of surgical anaesthesia with Chloroform: Firstly in 1842 by Robert Mortimer Glover then extended for use on humans by Sir James Young Simpson (1811–1870) Initial use of chloroform in dentistry by Francis Brodie Imlach
 The Saline drip by Dr Thomas Latta of Leith in 1831/32
 The hypodermic syringe: Alexander Wood (1817–1884)
 First diagnostic applications of an ultrasound scanner: Ian Donald (1910–1987)
 Independent discovery of inoculation for smallpox: Johnnie Notions
Discovery of hypnotism (November 1841): James Braid (1795–1860)
 General anaesthetic: Pioneered by Scotsman James Young Simpson and Englishman John Snow
Identifying the mosquito as the carrier of malaria: Sir Ronald Ross (1857–1932)
 Identifying the cause of brucellosis: Sir David Bruce (1855–1931)
 Discovering the vaccine for typhoid fever: Sir William B. Leishman (1865–1926)
 Electrocardiography: Alexander Muirhead (1869)
 Discovery of Staphylococcus: Sir Alexander Ogston (1880)
 Discovering insulin: John J R Macleod (1876–1935) with others The discovery led him to be awarded the 1923 Nobel prize in Medicine.
 Penicillin: Sir Alexander Fleming (1881–1955)
 Pioneering of X-ray cinematography: John Macintyre (1896); the first moving real time X-ray image and the first KUB X-ray diagnostic image of a kidney stone in situ
 Establishment of standardized Ophthalmology: Sir Stewart Duke-Elder, a pioneering Ophthalmologist in the 1930-50s
 The first hospital Radiation therapy unit: John Macintyre (1902); to assist in the diagnosis and treatment of injuries and illness at Glasgow Royal Infirmary
The Haldane effect, a property of hemoglobin: First described by John Scott Haldane (1907)
 The first Decompression tables: John Scott Haldane (1908); to calculate the safe return of deep-sea divers to surface atmospheric pressure
 Oxygen therapy: John Scott Haldane (1922), with the publication of ‘The Therapeutic Administration of Oxygen Therapy’, beginning the modern era of Oxygen therapy
 Transplant rejection: Professor Thomas Gibson (1940s) the first medical doctor to understand the relationship between donor graft tissue and host tissue rejection and tissue transplantation by his work on aviation burns victims during World War II
 Discovering an effective tuberculosis treatment: Sir John Crofton in the 1950s
 Developing the first beta-blocker drugs: Sir James W. Black in 1964; revolutionized the medical management of angina and is considered to be one of the most important contributions to clinical medicine and pharmacology of the 20th century. In 1988 Black was awarded the Nobel Prize in Medicine.
 Developing modern asthma therapy based both on bronchodilation (salbutamol) and anti-inflammatory steroids (beclomethasone dipropionate): Sir David Jack (1972)
 Chainsaw invented by surgeons John Aitken and James Jeffray for widening the birth canal during difficult childbirth
 Glasgow coma scale: Graham Teasdale and Bryan J. Jennett (1974)
 Glasgow Outcome Scale: Bryan J. Jennett & Sir Michael Bond (1975): diagnostic tool for patients with brain injuries, such as cerebral traumas
 Discovering and developing the anesthetic drug Propofol: Dr. John B. Glen (1977); a globally-used surgical anesthetic common in general surgery cases. In 2018 Dr. Glen received a Lasker Award.
 Glasgow Anxiety Scale: J.Mindham and C.A Espie (2003)
 Glasgow Depression Scale: Fiona Cuthill (2003); the first accurate self-report scale to measure the levels of depression in people with learning disabilities
 Discovering the Human papillomavirus vaccine: Ian Frazer (2006); the second cancer preventing vaccine, and the world's first vaccine designed to prevent a cancer
 Surface Enhanced Raman Scattering (SERS): Strathclyde University (2014); a laser and nanoparticle test to detect Meningitis or multiple pathogenic agents at the same time.

Household innovations
 The television: John Logie Baird (1923)
 The refrigerator: William Cullen (1748)
 The flush toilet: Alexander Cumming (1775)
 The vacuum flask: Sir James Dewar (1847–1932)
 The first distiller to triple distill Irish whiskey:John Jameson (Whisky distiller)
 The piano footpedal: John Broadwood (1732–1812)
 The first automated can-filling machine John West (1809–1888)
 The waterproof macintosh: Charles Macintosh (1766–1843)
 The kaleidoscope: Sir David Brewster (1781–1868)
 Keiller's marmalade Janet Keiller (1797) - The first recipe of rind suspended marmalade or Dundee marmalade produced in Dundee.
 The modern lawnmower: Alexander Shanks (1801–1845)
 The Lucifer friction match: Sir Isaac Holden (1807–1897)
 The self filling pen: Robert Thomson (1822–1873)
 Cotton-reel thread: J & J Clark of Paisley
 Lime cordial: Lauchlan Rose in 1867
 Bovril beef extract: John Lawson Johnston in 1874
 The electric clock: Alexander Bain (1840)
 Chemical Telegraph (Automatic Telegraphy) Alexander Bain (1846) In England Bain's telegraph was used on the wires of the Electric Telegraph Company to a limited extent, and in 1850 it was used in America.
 Barr's Irn-Bru, soft drink produced by Barr's in Cumbernauld Scotland and exported all around the world. The drink is so widely popular in Scotland that it outsells both American colas Coca-Cola and Pepsi and ranks 3rd most popular drink in the UK with Coca-Cola and Pepsi taking the first two spots.

Weapons innovations
 The carronade cannon: Robert Melville (1723–1809)
 The Ferguson rifle: Patrick Ferguson in 1770
 The Lee bolt system as used in the Lee–Metford and Lee–Enfield series rifles: James Paris Lee
 The Ghillie suit pioneered by the Lovat Scouts
 The percussion cap: invented by Scottish Presbyterian clergyman Alexander Forsyth

Miscellaneous innovations
 Boys' Brigade: Sir William Alexander Smith
 Bank of England devised by William Paterson
 Bank of France devised by John Law
 Grand Theft Auto: developed by Scottish game developers DMA Design (later known as Rockstar North)
The industrialisation and modernisation of Japan by Thomas Blake Glover
 Colour photography: the first known permanent colour photograph was taken by James Clerk Maxwell (1831–1879)
 Buick Motor Company by David Dunbar Buick
 New York Herald newspaper by James Gordon Bennett, Sr.
Pinkerton National Detective Agency by Allan Pinkerton
 Forbes magazine by B. C. Forbes
 Fried chicken: the origin of fried chicken in the southern states of America has been traced to precedents in Scottish cuisine.
 The establishment of a standardized botanical institute: Isaac Bayley Balfour
 London School of Hygiene & Tropical Medicine: founded by Sir Patrick Manson in 1899
 Educational reform at the College of New Jersey that influenced other universities and American culture and intellectual movements done by John Witherspoon
 The performance of John Paul Jones as a commander in the Continental Navy kept it going and helped it become the modern United States Navy.

See also
 List of British innovations and discoveries
 List of English inventions and discoveries
 List of domesticated Scottish breeds
 List of Welsh inventors
 Homecoming Scotland 2009
 Timeline of Irish inventions and discoveries
 Science in Medieval Western Europe

References

Visit Scotland - Scottish Inventions

Publications
Great Scottish Discoveries and Inventions, Bill Fletcher, William W. Fletcher, John Harrold, Drew, 1985, University of California, 
Great Scottish inventions and discoveries: a concise guide : a selection of Scottish inventions and discoveries made over a period stretching back to the fifteenth century, John Geddes, Northern Books, 1994
Scottish Inventors, Alistair Fyfe, HarperCollins, 1999, 
The Scottish invention of America, democracy and human rights: a history of liberty and freedom from the ancient Celts to the New Millennium, Alexander Leslie Klieforth, Robert John Munro, University Press of America, 2004, 
Philosophical chemistry in the Scottish enlightenment: the doctrines and discoveries of William Cullen and Joseph Black, Arthur L. Donovan

External links
Top Twenty Scottish Inventions, 15th International World Wide Web Conference, Edinburgh, 2006
Scottish Inventors . . . who keep the world in touch, Global Friends of Scotland (a Scottish Executive website)
Scottish Inventors and their Inventions, Kenmay Academy

 
Inventions
Lists of inventions or discoveries